Lucerne transient streak virus (LTSV) is a pathogenic plant virus.

External links
ICTVdB - The Universal Virus Database: Lucerne transient streak virus
Family Groups - The Baltimore Method

Sobemoviruses
Viral plant pathogens and diseases